Kannur is a city in Kerala, India. It may also refer to:
 Kannur district, a district in Kerala
 Kannur taluk, one among the 5 taluks of Kannur district
 Kannur (Lok Sabha constituency), a parliamentary constituency in India
 Kannur (State Assembly constituency), an assembly constituency in Kerala
 Kannur railway station, a major railway station in Kerala
 Peral-Kannur, a village in Puthige Panchayat of Kasaragod district